The Great Comet of 1811, formally designated C/1811 F1, is a comet that was visible to the naked eye for around 260 days, the longest recorded period of visibility until the appearance of Comet Hale–Bopp in 1997. In October 1811, at its brightest, and when it was 1.2 AU from Earth, it displayed an apparent magnitude of 0, with an easily visible coma.

Discovery 

The comet was discovered  March 25, 1811 by Honoré Flaugergues at 2.7 AU from the Sun in the now-defunct constellation of Argo Navis. After being obscured for several days by moonlight, it was also found by Jean-Louis Pons on April 11, while Franz Xaver, Baron Von Zach was able to confirm Flaugergues' discovery the same night.

The first provisional orbit was computed in June by Johann Karl Burckhardt. Based on these calculations, Heinrich Wilhelm Matthäus Olbers made a prediction that the comet would go on to become extremely bright later that year.

Observations 

From May to August, the comet's position made it difficult to spot because of its low altitude and the evening twilight. Both Flaugergues and Olbers were able to recover it in Leo Minor during August, Olbers noting a small but distinct tail, consisting of two rays forming a parabola, when viewing through a comet seeker. In August, the comet was first sighted in the United Kingdom by James Veitch of Inchbonny. By September, in Ursa Major, it was becoming a conspicuous object in the evening sky as it approached perihelion: William Herschel noted that a tail 25° long had developed by October 6.

By January 1812, the comet's brightness had faded. Several astronomers continued to obtain telescopic observations for some months, the last being Vincent Wisniewski at Novocherkassk, who noted it as barely reaching an apparent magnitude of 11 by August 12.

The Great Comet of 1811 was thought to have had an exceptionally large coma, perhaps reaching over 1 million miles across—fifty percent larger than the Sun. The comet's nucleus was later estimated at 30–40 km in diameter. Before perihelion passage on September 12, 1811, the comet had an orbital period of 2742 years. After perihelion passage the comet has a period of 2974 years. In many ways the comet was quite similar to Comet Hale–Bopp: it became spectacular without passing particularly close to either the Earth or the Sun, but had an extremely large and active nucleus.

Astronomers also found the comet a memorable sight. William Henry Smyth, comparing his recollections of the Great Comet of 1811 to the spectacular Donati's Comet, stated that "as a mere sight-object, the branched tail was of greater interest, the nucleus with its 'head-veil' was more distinct, and its circumpolarity was a fortunate incident for gazers".

The comet was apparently visible during the New Madrid earthquakes in December, 1811. A report on the first steamship to descend the Ohio River as it approached the confluence with the Mississippi River states, "December 18, 1811.—The anniversary of this day the people of Cairo [Illinois] and its vicinity should never forget. It was the coming of the first steamboat to where Cairo now is—the New Orleans, Capt. Roosevelt, Commanding. It was the severest day of the great throes of the New Madrid earthquake; at the same time, a fiery comet was rushing athwart the horizon".

Allusions in culture 

The Great Comet of 1811 seems to have had a particular impact on non-astronomers. The artists John Linnell and William Blake both witnessed it, the former producing several sketches and the latter possibly incorporating it in his famous panel The Ghost of a Flea.

The English travel writer, novelist, and political economist  Harriet Martineau (1802–1876) makes an odd reference to not seeing the comet in her Autobiography: "When the great comet of 1811 was attracting all eyes...[n]ight after night, the whole family of us went up to the long windows at the top of my father's warehouse; and the exclamations on all hands about the comet perfectly exasperated me,—because I could not see it!... Such is the fact; and philosophers may make of it what they may,—remembering that I was then nine years old, and with remarkably good eyes."

In China, some leaders of the Eight Trigram Sect took the comet to be "auspicious blessing for their enterprise" to overthrow the Qing dynasty. They launched their uprising in 1813.

At the midpoint of War and Peace, Tolstoy describes the character of Pierre observing this "enormous and brilliant comet [...] which was said to portend all kinds of woes and the end of the world". The comet was popularly thought to have portended Napoleon's invasion of Russia (even being referred to as "Napoleon's Comet") and the War of 1812, among other events. In the musical Natasha, Pierre & The Great Comet of 1812,  Pierre witnesses the comet. When asked why the comet made it into the title of the show, the composer Dave Malloy responded "for cosmic epicness."

The year 1811 turned out to be particularly fine for wine production, and merchants marketed "Comet Wine" at high prices for many years afterwards. The film Year of the Comet, a 1992 romantic comedy adventure film, is based on this premise and tells the story of the pursuit of a contemporarily discovered bottle of wine from the year of the Great Comet, bottled for Napoleon. The film stars Penelope Ann Miller, Tim Daly and French film actor Louis Jourdan (his last film before retiring).

The Great Comet is mentioned in Pan Tadeusz by Adam Mickiewicz; and in Les Misérables by Victor Hugo.

The Shawnee military leader Tecumseh, whose name was translated as "shooting star", claimed the appearance of the comet as a favorable omen during his mostly unsuccessful efforts that year to bring southern tribes into his pan-Native American alliance.

References

External links 
 JPL DASTCOM Orbital Elements

Non-periodic comets
18110325
Great comets